The Himachal Pradesh Legislative Assembly or the Himachal Pradesh Vidhan Sabha is the unicameral legislature of the Indian state of Himachal Pradesh. The present strength of the Vidhan Sabha is 68. The members of the Tenth Legislative Assembly were elected in the 1998 Himachal Pradesh Legislative Assembly election.

Members of the Assembly 
The following assembly members were in the Ninth Legislative Assembly of Himachal Pradesh:

Notes:
Shri Sant Ram died on 30 June 1998. Shri Dulo Ram was elected from Baijnath in the following by-election.
Krishna Mohini was removed from his post by a Supreme Court Judgment on 26 October 1999. Rajeev Bindal was elected from Solan in the following by-election.

See also
Government of Himachal Pradesh

References

Himachal Pradesh Legislative Assembly